Éliphène Cadet (born 10 October 1980) is a Haitian professional footballer who plays as a forward.

Club career
Between 2000 and 2015 Cadet scored more than 70 goals in the Ligue Haïtienne.

Cadet hit referee Walner Laventure during a league match between Tempête FC and FICA after being sent off. The sending off was followed by a pitch invasion by fans who beat the game director. Cadet received a ten-match ban.

He joined second-tier club Port-de-Paix FC in April 2017. He moved to league rivals US Pont-Sondé in 2018.

Cadet joined Racing CH in October 2020. He agreed the termination of his contract the following month.

International career
Cadet was in the Haiti national team squad for the 2010 Caribbean Cup.

References

External links
 

1980 births
Living people
Haitian footballers
Association football forwards
Haiti international footballers
Ligue Haïtienne players
Aigle Noir AC players
AS Capoise players
Tempête FC players
Racing CH players